Dave White (born 1979) is a Derringer Award-winning mystery author and educator. White, an eighth grade teacher for the Clifton, NJ Public School district, has written two novels featuring former New Brunswick, New Jersey police detective turned private investigator Jackson Donne. The novels take place in locations around northern New Jersey. White grew up in Clifton, New Jersey. He attended Rutgers University and received his MAT from Montclair State University

White's two novels follow the characters established in his 2002 short story "Closure," which won the Derringer Award for Best Short Mystery Story the following year. Publishers Weekly has given both novels starred reviews calling When One Man Dies an "engrossing, evocative debut novel" and writing that his second novel "fulfills the promise of his debut." Roland Person writes in his Library Journal review that "his first novel is awkwardly written and marred by contradictions and improbable events."

Bibliography

External links
 Dave White's Website

References

Living people
Montclair State University alumni
People from Clifton, New Jersey
1979 births
American male novelists
American male short story writers
Place of birth missing (living people)
American short story writers
Novelists from New Jersey
21st-century American novelists
21st-century American male writers